James Bromley Spicer (May 12, 1958 – September 27, 2019) was an American hip hop recording artist who released a number of old school rap singles during the late 1970s and early 1980s including the classic "Dollar Bill Y'all," for which he was perhaps best known.  Spicer was managed by Russell Simmons' Rush Management. His single "The Bubble Bunch" featured  Jellybean Benitez's first remix.

Spicer had four daughters, Angelina, Leticia, Janel, and Princess and one son, James.

In 2018, he was diagnosed with advanced brain and lung cancer. He died on September 27, 2019, at the age of 61.

Discography
"Adventures of Super Rhyme (Rap)" (1980), Dazz Records - 12-inch single
"The Bubble Bunch" (1982), Mercury (US) - 12-inch single
"Money (Dollar Bill Y'all)" (1983), Spring Records - 12-inch single
"This Is It" / "Beat The Clock" (1985), Def Jam Recordings - 12-inch single
"I Rock Boots" (1990), Def Valley Records - 12-inch single
"$ Can't Buy U Luv (Money Can't Buy You Love)" (2010), Spice Rhymes

References

External links
Bio at Oldschoolhiphop.com

1958 births
2019 deaths
African-American male rappers
African-American record producers
American hip hop record producers
East Coast hip hop musicians
Rappers from Brooklyn
21st-century American rappers
21st-century American male musicians
Deaths from brain cancer in the United States
Deaths from lung cancer in New York (state)
21st-century African-American musicians
20th-century African-American people